Haifa Street (or Hayfa Street) is a two-mile-long street in Baghdad, Iraq, named after the port city of Haifa. It runs parallel to the Tigris and, along with Yafa Street (named after the port city of Jaffa), it leads to the Assassin's Gate, an archway that served as the main entrance to the American-run Green Zone during the 2003 invasion of Iraq. The street was given its current name by Saddam Hussein in the 1980s as part of a redevelopment program, and is lined with many high-rise buildings.

Prior to the 1990–91 Gulf War, the British Embassy in Iraq was located on Haifa Street.

During the American invasion of Iraq
Haifa Street was the location of the June 2004 Operation Haifa Street, and the September 2004 Haifa Street helicopter incident, in which a helicopter fired on a burning American Bradley Fighting Vehicle and killed 12 civilians, including journalist Mazen al-Tumeizi. Two days later a massive car bombing on Haifa Street killed 47. American troops stationed in Baghdad at the time, C Company, 1/153 IN of the Arkansas Army National Guard, part of Task Force 1/9, dubbed the street "Purple Heart Boulevard".  On December 24, 2004 U.S. Soldiers from B Co. 3/325th AIR of the 82d Airborne Division in taking over a palace, later dubbed Predator Palace,  and made it the 3/325th A.I.R. home for 4 months. During this time the paratroopers performed combat missions to assist weeding out the enemy. Ultimately the efforts of B Co. 3/325 AIR, made Haifa Street a safer place. By mid-2005 there were reports that conditions on Haifa Street had calmed, and control of the street was turned over to Iraqi forces in February 2006 but as of early 2007 the street remained riddled with insurgent hideouts. Fifty people were killed in a U.S.-led operation there on January 9, 2007 and another thirty were killed on January 24.

Gallery

References

External links
 Video of gun battle on Haifa Street, January 2007

Neighborhoods in Baghdad
Streets in Baghdad